This is a list of hottest stars so far discovered (excluding degenerate stars), arranged by decreasing temperature. The stars with temperatures higher than 60,000 K are included.

List

See also
List of most massive stars
List of most luminous stars
List of least massive stars
List of coolest stars

References

hottest stars, list of
Stars, hottest
stars, hottest